Giulietta "Lietta" Tornabuoni (24 March 1931–11 January 2011) was an Italian film critic, journalist and author.

Life and career
Born in  Pisa into an aristocratic family, Tornabuoni started her journalistic career in 1949 for the magazine Noi donne. In the late 1960s she worked for a conservative women's magazine, Annabella, and in one of her articles she argued that for men from the lower classes miniskirts were vulgar, but more educated men believed that these should be accepted by Italians. She is best known as the main film critic of the newspaper La Stampa, with which she collaborated from 1970 to the rest of her career. Other collaborations include L'Espresso, Novella, Corriere della Sera and L'Europeo. She was also author of several books, maily related to cinema. She died of the consequences of a fall, at the age of 79.

References

External links
Lietta Tornabuoni at Treccani
 

1931 births
2011 deaths
Italian essayists
20th-century Italian journalists
Italian film critics
People from Pisa
Italian women journalists